Los lanzallamas (English: The Flamethrowers) is a book by the Argentine writer Roberto Arlt. The book is written in Spanish.

The book was published by Editorial Claridad in Buenos Aires in 1931. It was included in the second volume of Novelas Completas y Cuentos (English: Complete Novels and Stories) published by Compañía General Fabril Editora in Buenos Aires in 1963. It was published by Compañía General Fabril Editora in Buenos Aires in 1968 and 1972, and by Editorial Losada in Buenos Aires in about 1977. It was published by Bruguera in Barcelona in 1980. 

The book was translated into French by Lucien Mercier and published under the title Les lance-flammes by Belfond in Paris in 1983. It was translated into German by Bruno Keller and published under the title Die Flammenwerfer by Insel Verlag in 1973. It was translated into Italian by Luigi Pellisari and published under the title I lanciafiamme by Bompiani in Milan in 1974. The novel was translated into English by Larry Riley as The Flamethowers and published in 2021 by corona\samizdat (Slovenia), with an introduction by the press's publisher Rick Harsch.

It has been said that Los lanzallamas is title of the second installment of a single novel, the first instalment having been published in 1929 under the title Los siete locos. or an "unofficial" sequel to, Los siete locos. Nevertheless, contrary opinions have also been stated.

Los lanzallamas has been called a "fully realized" masterpiece.

Characters in the book include Erdosain, Hipolita and Arturo Haffner.

References
Paul Jordan. "Los Siete Locos and Los Lanzallamas" in Roberto Arlt: A Narrative Journey. King's College London, Department of Spanish & Spanish-American Studies. 2000. Page 90. Google Books.
Rita Gnutzmann. Roberto Arlt o el arte del calidoscopio. Universidad del País Vasco (University of the Basque Country). 1984. Passim. Google Books
Mario Goboloff (coordinator). Roberto Arlt: Los siete locos; Los lanzallamas. Critical edition. University of Costa Rica. 2000. See section 1 (page xiii) and sections 3 to 7 (page 599 to 864).
Nicolás Olivari, "Los lanzallamas", Claridad, 28 November 1931 (number 239)
Beatriz Pastor, "De la rebelión al fascismo: Los siete locos y Los lanzallamas" (1980) Hispamérica, Year 9, No 27, pages 19 to 32 JSTOR Google Books
Norman Cheadle. The Ironic Apocalypse in the Novels of Leopoldo Marechal. Tamesis. London. 2000. Page 5.

1931 books
1931 in Argentina
Argentine books